Glyphipterix gemmipunctella is a species of sedge moth in the genus Glyphipterix. It is found in Australia, where it is found on the Atherton Tableland in Queensland and from southern Queensland to Victoria.

References

Moths described in 1869
Glyphipterigidae
Moths of Australia